Alma Lund (1854–1932) was a Finnish soprano opera singer and actress. She was on stage primarily at the Finnish National Opera, the Novanderska Society, and Den Nationale Scene. She was a part of the choir at the Finnish National Theatre. The part of Marta in Gounod's Faust is her most iconic role. She retired from the opera in 1920. She also starred in Norway's first feature film, Fiskerlivets farer.

She was married to fellow opera singer Bjarne Lund (1858–1894).

References

1854 births
1932 deaths
Finnish operatic sopranos
Finnish actresses
19th-century Finnish women opera singers